In cryptography, MOSQUITO was a stream cipher algorithm designed by Joan Daemen and Paris Kitsos. It was submitted to the eSTREAM Project of the eCRYPT network. After the initial design was broken by Joux and Muller, a tweaked version named MOUSTIQUE was proposed which made it to Phase 3 of the eSTREAM evaluation process as the only self-synchronizing cipher remaining. However, MOUSTIQUE was subsequently broken by Käsper et al., leaving the design of a secure and efficient self-synchronising stream cipher as an open research problem.

Cryptographic algorithms